is an action platform game released by Capcom for the Game Boy in 1992. It is an adaptation of the Nintendo Entertainment System version of Bionic Commando, changing the present day setting of the NES version into a futuristic science fiction one.

Plot

The Game Boy version follows the same plot as the NES version, changing the present-day setting of the NES version with a futuristic one. The player takes the role of Rad Spencer (Ladd in the original NES version), an agent of the FF Corps (the FF Battalion in the NES version), whose mission is to rescue his ally Super Joe from the Doraize Army and prevent their leader, Director Wiseman (named after the Weizmann character from the Japanese Famicom game, who was renamed Killt in the NES localization), from the Doraize Army's secret project codenamed Albatross

This version also shifts the military theme present in the original to a more sci-fi territory. The uniforms and helmets of the enemies are changed for futuristic armors and "spiky" hair. This version also adds a more modern cinema-like opening and ending sequences. These sequences and character drawings in the in-game dialogues, making the Game Boy version more story oriented.

Gameplay
Like the NES version, the player must navigate through the overworld map to move from level to level with a transport helicopter, called "DX-3 Turbocopter". A difference from the NES version are the player's encounters with enemy transport vehicles. While on the NES version, these encounters featured a top-down interface, on the Game Boy version, they remain side-scrolling like the rest of the game.

Notes

References

External links

1992 video games
Bionic Commando
Capcom games
Game Boy games
Game Boy-only games
Platform games
Post-apocalyptic video games
Science fiction video games
Side-scrolling video games
Video games developed in Japan
Video games about cyborgs
Virtual Console games
Virtual Console games for Nintendo 3DS